The strikes were conducted by the Israeli Air Force late at night on 25 August 2019.

Lt. Col. Jonathan Conricus, an IDF spokesman, told that Israeli officials had been monitoring a plot for several months in which they thought Iran's Revolutionary Guards’  force had been planning to send explosives-laden attack drones into Israel. He claimed that the Iranians initially attempted to put the plan into motion on Thursday. However, Iran did not have a reaction.

Incident
According to the report of  Syrian military by the official Sana news agency, At 23.30 aircraft defenses were detected from Golan heading towards the area around Damascus. According to the IDF sites in the town of Aqrabah, southeast of Damascus, near the city's airport was targeted. As a result of the strikes, several Military Intelligence units, air force squadrons, and air defense units were put on high alert. Supplementary air defenses forces were deployed to northern Israel for a precautionary measure.

As Syrian state TV announced, Syrian air army had responded to "hostile" targets over Damascus, they reported that "most of the hostile Israeli missiles were destroyed before reaching their targets".

As the Britain-based Syrian Observatory for Human Rights monitoring group mentioned, several missiles targeted positions maintained by foreign forces, while others were downed by air forces.

Since the beginning of the war in Syria in 2011, Israel has managed hundreds of strikes in Syria, most of them against what it says are Iranian and Hezbollah targets. Direct clashes between Israel and Iranian forces have been rare.

Aftermath
According to Mohammed Afif, a spokesman of Hezbollah, a day after Israeli warplanes struck targets in Syria, two Israeli drones crashed in the southern suburbs of Beirut overnight, and one damaged a media office belonging to Hezbollah, although the Israeli military does not comment on it as "foreign reports".

Reaction
The Israeli Prime Minister Benjamin Netanyahu by confirming the airstrike warned on Twitter that "Iran has no immunity anywhere. Our forces operate in every sector against the Iranian aggression. 'If someone rises up to kill you, kill him first.'"

Lt. Col. Jonathan Conricus, an IDF spokesman stated that although Iranian forces had launched rockets and missiles at Israel from Syria three times during 2018, the use of Loitering munition set to explode on their targets was a new and "different tactic".

See also
 Syria missile strikes (September 2018)
 Syria missile strikes (November 2019)
 List of the Israel Defense Forces operations

References

2019 in the Syrian civil war
August 2019 events in Syria
2019 in Israel
21st-century aircraft shootdown incidents
Aerial operations and battles involving Israel
Airstrikes during the Syrian civil war
Attacks on buildings and structures in Syria
Military operations of the Syrian civil war in 2019
Damascus in the Syrian civil war
Israel–Syria military relations
Iran–Israel conflict during the Syrian civil war
Israeli involvement in the Syrian civil war